Jesup–Wayne County Airport  is a county-owned, public-use airport located three nautical miles (6 km) south of the central business district of Jesup, a city in Wayne County, Georgia, United States. It is also known as William A. Zorn Airport.

This airport is included in the National Plan of Integrated Airport Systems for 2011–2015, which categorized it as a general aviation facility. Although most U.S. airports use the same three-letter location identifier for the FAA and IATA, this airport is assigned JES by the FAA but has no designation from the IATA.

Facilities and aircraft 
It has one runway designated 11/29 with an asphalt surface measuring 5,500 by 100 feet (1,676 x 30 m).

For the 12-month period ending December 31, 2011, the airport had 5,500 general aviation aircraft operations, an average of 15 per day. At that time there were 14 aircraft based at this airport: 86% single-engine and 14% ultralight.

References

External links 
 Airport page ay Wayne County website
 SutAir Flying Service, the fixed-base operator (FBO)
 Aerial image as of February 1999 from USGS The National Map
 

Airports in Georgia (U.S. state)
Transportation in Wayne County, Georgia